The Ouse Washes Landscape Partnership scheme (OWLP) is a 3-year project supported by the Heritage Lottery Fund which runs from 2014 - 2017. The scheme focuses on the promotion of the area surrounding the Ouse Washes, the heart of the Cambridgeshire and Norfolk Fens, and on encouraging community engagement with the area’s diverse heritage.

A Landscape Partnership scheme (LP) is a Heritage Lottery Fund grant-aided programme which is delivered in a partnership made up of local, regional and national organisations with an interest in an area. The main aim of such schemes is to conserve the UK’s distinctive landscape character areas. A Landscape Partnership is based around a portfolio of smaller projects, which together provide long-term social, economic and environmental benefits for the landscape and its communities. These projects focus on the following outcomes:
Conserving or restoring the built and natural features that create the historic landscape character;
Increasing community participation;
Increasing access and learning about the landscape;
Increasing training opportunities in local heritage skills.

The area targeted by the OWLP scheme focuses on the distinctive rural, open and tranquil landscape surrounding the Ouse Washes; this landscape includes important wetland and washland habitats set within productive agricultural land. The project focuses on the area around the Old Bedford River and New Bedford River in the Cambridgeshire and Norfolk Fens and includes the RSPB nature reserves to its south, near St Ives and Fen Drayton. This unique landscape area includes or abuts a large number of vibrant small settlements and is close to the market towns and cities of Downham Market, Chatteris, March, Littleport, Ely, Cambridge and St. Ives.

With a wide partnership of 28 key organisations, the Ouse Washes Landscape Partnership aims to strengthen partnership working across all levels and all land use interests; develop strong community involvement and empowerment; and promote the OWLP area as a visitor destination in its own right.

References

External links
Ouse Washes Landscape Partnership - official site
RSPB Ouse Washes
WWT Welney
SPA designation
Accelerated collaboration and visiualisation to understand the Ouse Washes

River Great Ouse
Environmental organisations based in England